Brenthia excusana is a species of moth of the family Choreutidae. It was described by Francis Walker in 1863. It is found on Borneo.

References

Brenthia
Moths described in 1863